Dunkleosteidae is an extinct family of arthrodire placoderms that lived during the Devonian period. The gigantic apex predator Dunkleosteus terrelli is the best known member of this group.

Phylogeny
While members of Dunkleosteidae were previously thought to be close relatives of the genus Dinichthys (when they were not synonymized as each other) and grouped together in the family Dinichthyidae, more recent phylogenetic studies have shown that the two taxa represent two very distinct clades within Arthrodira. Dunkleosteidae was then established as the sister taxon to the family Panxiosteidae, which together comprised the superfamily Dunkleosteoidea (one of the three major clades of Eubrachythoraci). Dunkleosteidae was thus cladistically defined as including the type genus Dunkleosteus and all other genera in Dunkleosteoidea more closely related to Dunkleosteus than to Panxiosteus. 

The phylogeny of Dunkleosteidae from the 2013 Zhu & Zhu study is shown in the cladogram below:

However, the subsequent 2016 Zhu et al. study using a larger morphological dataset recovered Panxiosteidae well outside of Dunkleosteoidea, leaving the status of Dunkleosteidae as a clade grouping separate from Dunkleosteoidea in doubt, as shown in the cladogram below:
{{clade| style=font-size:85%;line-height:85%
 |label1=Eubrachythoraci
 |1={{clade
  |label1=Coccosteomorphi
  |1=
  |label2=Pachyosteomorphi
  |2={{clade
   |1=Rhachiosteus pterygiatus
   |2={{clade
    |label1=Dunkleosteoidea
    |1=
    |label2=Aspinothoracidi
    |2={{clade
     |1=Tapinosteus heintzi
     |2={{clade
      |1=
      |2={{clade
       |1=Dinichthys herzeri
       |2={{clade
        |1=Hadrosteus rapax
        |2={{clade
         |1=Gorgonichthys clarki
         |label2=Selenosteidae
         |2={{clade
          |1=Heintzichthys gouldii
          |2=Pachyosteus bulla
          |3=Gymnotrachelus hydei'
          |4=Stenosteus angustopectus          |5=Brachyosteus dietrichi          |6= }} }} }} }} }} }} }} }} }} }}

Genera

Dunkleosteus

The type genus, Dunkleosteus, is known from Late Frasnian and Famennian-aged marine strata from Europe, Morocco, and North America.

EastmanosteusEastmanosteous is a diverse genus of medium to somewhat large predatory arthrodires very similar in anatomy to the species of Dunkleosteus. Eastmanosteus differs from Dunkleosteus in having a unique tubercle-ornamentation on the dermal surfaces of the plates, a distinctively shaped nuchal plate, and sutures that are more zigzagging. The best studied species, E. calliaspis may not be of this genus due to its recently appreciated relationship to the Emsian-aged genus Xiangshuiosteus.

Golshanichthys
Fossils of Golshanichthys are found in Frasnian-aged marine strata near Kerman, Iran.

HeterosteusHeterosteus is from the middle Devonian, found in Europe and Greenland.

Kiangyousteus

This Middle Devonian genus represents the first arthrodire described from China. Fossils are known from the Late Givetian to Early Frasnian-aged Guanwu Formation in Sichuan province.

XiangshuiosteusXiangshuiosteus was originally described as an arthrodire incertae sedis of the Late Emsian with anatomical features suggestive of both buchanosteids and coccosteids. With the reappraisal of Kiangyousteus, it is now thought to be a dunkleosteid most closely related to Eastmanosteus calliaspis''.

References 

 
Placoderm families
Early Devonian first appearances
Late Devonian animals
Late Devonian extinctions